George Norman Stansfield  (28 February 192615 April 2018) was a British diplomat who worked for the United Kingdom's Foreign and Commonwealth Office and served as the British High Commissioner to Solomon Islands (1982–86).

Career 

Stansfield was the son of George and Alice Stansfield and was born in Manchester, Lancashire, England on 28 February 1926. He joined the Royal Air Force in 1944 and served during the Second World War. He joined the Civil Service, in the Ministries of Food and Supply, from 1948 to 1958. He joined the Foreign and Commonwealth Office and was Assistant (or Private Secretary) to the Director-General of Armaments Production in the War Office from 1958 to 1961.

He joined the Commonwealth Office in 1961 and became Second Secretary to Calcutta, India, from 1962 to 1966, and to Port of Spain, Trinidad and Tobago, from 1966. He became First Secretary in the Foreign and Commonwealth Office from 1968 until 1971, and also served in Singapore from 1971 to 1974. He was appointed as Consul at the Consulate-General in Durban, South Africa, in 1974.

In the Foreign and Commonwealth Office from 1978, Stansfield became First Secretary then Counsellor, and was Head of the Overseas Estate (Accommodation and Services) Department from 1980 to 1982. Stansfield succeeded Gordon Slater as the British High Commmissioner to the Solomon Islands in 1982, serving for four years until he was succeeded by John Noss in 1986. He was later a consultant and instructor in the Foreign and Commonwealth Office until his retirement in 2002.

Honours 
Stansfield was appointed an Officer of the Order of the British Empire (OBE) in the 1980 New Year Honours and a Commander of the Order of the British Empire (CBE) in the 1985 Birthday Honours.

See also 

 List of High Commissioners of the United Kingdom to Solomon Islands

References 

1926 births
2018 deaths
20th-century British diplomats
21st-century British diplomats
High Commissioners to the Solomon Islands
Members of HM Diplomatic Service
British diplomats
Royal Air Force personnel of World War II
Royal Air Force officers